Gilberto "Bibit" Muñoz Duavit, Sr. (November 29, 1934 – December 14, 2018) was a Filipino lawyer, entrepreneur and politician. He was a major figure in the GMA Network Inc. and a member of the House of Representatives from 1994 to 2001.

Early life and education
Duavit was born on November 29, 1934, in Manila. He was the son of Margarito Duavit and Rosa Muñoz.

He earned his Bachelor of Arts and law degree from the University of the East Manila, and held a doctorate degree in humanities from the University of Rizal System.

Career
He was chairman of GMA Network, Inc. from 1974 to 1976 and was a former director of the company in 1977. He along with accountant Menardo Jimenez and lawyer Felipe Gozon acquired the Republic Broadcasting System (RBS) from Robert Stewart  in 1974 and renamed as GMA Radio-Television Arts.

Duavit sat as chairman and chief executive officer of Group Management and Development, Inc., as well as chairman of Guronasyon Foundation, Inc., an organization which recognizes remarkable teachers in the province of Rizal. He was also chair or director of various firms and companies, among them Permastress Industries, Inc., Unistress Concrete Systems, Inc., Sagittarius Condominium Corporation, and Mar Fishing Company, Inc.

Political career
Duavit was a former assistant executive secretary for social, political, legal, and economic affairs (1966–1970) and acting executive secretary, Office of the President (1969), and was twice awarded the Presidential Merit Award in 1967 and 1968.

He became a delegate to the 1971 Constitutional Convention, representing the 2nd district of Rizal, and president of the Philippine Constitutional Association (PHILCONSA) in 1970.

He served as executive director of the National Youth and Sports Development Foundation of the Philippines (1978), and as senior deputy minister of the Ministry of Youth and Sports Development (1974–1978). He was also a member of the Batasang Pambasa, representing the Southern Tagalog Region from 1978 to 1984.

From 1994 to 2001, Duavit was elected as member of the 9th, 10th, and 11th Congresses, representing the 1st District of Rizal.

During his stint in Congress, he served as senior assistant minority floor leader (10th Congress) and chairman of the House Committee of Appropriations (11th Congress) after becoming a member of the same House Committee (9th and 10th Congress).

He had likewise served as a member of various House Committees including Constitutional Amendments, Education and Culture, Housing and Urban Development, Public Works and Highways, and Banks and Financial Intermediaries.

As a lawmaker, Duavit was cited as One of the Ten Most Outstanding Congressmen in the 9th, 10th, and 11th Congresses.

Personal life
He married Vilma D. Roy and bore four children, namely GMA network president and chief operating officer Gilberto Duavit Jr., Rizal Representative Michael John Duavit, Rizal former representative Joel Roy Duavit, and GMA board member Judith Duavit Vasquez.

Death
Duavit died on December 14, 2018 due to a stroke. He was 84 years old. His cremated remains were placed at The Heritage Park in Taguig for public viewing. On December 18, 2018, his ashes were brought Binangonan, Rizal.

References

1934 births
2018 deaths
21st-century Filipino politicians
GMA Network (company) people
Members of the House of Representatives of the Philippines from Rizal
University of the East alumni
Ferdinand Marcos administration personnel
Advisers to the President of the Philippines
Recipients of the Presidential Medal of Merit (Philippines)
Chairmen of GMA Network